CMA CGM Alexander von Humboldt is an Explorer class containership built for CMA CGM. It is named after Alexander von Humboldt.

CMA CGM had originally planned to name the ship after Portuguese explorer Vasco da Gama.

Scheduled for delivery in June 2013, it is among the world's largest containerships, at 16,020 TEU.

References

Container ships
Alexander von Humboldt
Alexander von Humboldt
Ships built by Daewoo Shipbuilding & Marine Engineering
2012 ships